Christian Jesus González Nodal  (born January 11, 1999) is a Mexican musician, singer, and songwriter born and raised in Sonora, Mexico.  His debut studio album, Me Dejé Llevar (2017), was met with critical acclaim and success. Nodal has won three Latin Grammy Awards, a Lo Nuestro Award, two Billboard Latin Music Awards, and a Latin American Music Award.

Life and career 
Christian Nodal was born and raised in Caborca, Sonora, Mexico. According to Nodal, he started singing at the age of four and later learned how to play the piano and guitar on his own.

In January 2017, Nodal released "Adiós Amor" which quickly became a success in Mexico and the United States," reaching number one on the Top 20 General Mexican Songs Chart and number two on the Billboard Top Latin Songs chart in the United States. In June 2017, Nodal collaborated with the Spanish singer, David Bisbal and released "Probablemente". Bisbal told Billboard, "...he [Nodal] a great interpreter but also a songwriter. I love what he's doing and it's an honor to be a part of the early stages in his career."

In August 2017, Nodal released his debut album, Me Dejé Llevar. It topped music charts in Mexico and the United States. Music critic Thom Jurek of Allmusic, praised the album and called it "elegant." Me Dejé Llevar went on to be nominated for a Latin Grammy Award for Best Ranchero Album at the 19th Annual Latin Grammy Awards, while "Probablemente", won for Best Regional Mexican Song. Nodal was also nominated for Best New Artist but lost to Colombian reggaeton singer Karol G.

In 2018, Nodal accompanied Mexican performer Pepe Aguilar and his family, brother Antonio Aguilar Jr., daughter Ángela Aguilar and son Leonardo Aguilar on their equestrian-musical style tour dubbed "Jaripeo Sin Fronteras".

In May 2019, Nodal released his second studio album, Ahora. It debuted in the top ten of the Billboard Top Latin Albums chart in the United States. Nodal also initiated a tour to promote the album.

In February 2022, Nodal formally confirmed his breakup from Belinda. The couple were originally engaged in May 2021.

Discography

Studio albums

Collaborative albums

Extended plays

Singles

As lead artist

As featured artist

Promotional singles

Other charted songs and certifications

Guest appearances

Awards and nominations 

Note: Additionally, two other songs performed by Nodal but not written by him have been nominated for the Latin Grammy Award for Best Regional Mexican Song, the nomination went to the songwriters of each song, "De Los Besos Que Te Di" in 2019, written by José Esparza & Gussy Lau; and "Cuando Me Dé la Gana" in 2022, written by Christina Aguilera, Rafael Arcaute, Jorge Luis Chacín, Kat Dahlia, Yoel Henríquez, Yasmil Marrufo & Federico Vindver.

Notes

References 

1999 births
Living people
Singers from Sonora
Mariachi musicians
Fonovisa Records artists
Latin Grammy Award winners
21st-century Mexican singers
21st-century Mexican male singers
People from Caborca
Latin music songwriters